Star Wars: The Rise of Skywalker – Original Motion Picture Soundtrack is the film score to the 2019 film of the same name composed and conducted by John Williams. The soundtrack album was released in both digital formats and digipak CD by Walt Disney Records on December 18 and 20, 2019 respectively. It is his final soundtrack for the franchise; shortly before the sessions began, Williams announced that he would be retiring from Star Wars after over 40 years as its musical heart. The score won Williams a Saturn Award for Best Music.

Overview
On January 10, 2018, it was confirmed that John Williams would return to compose and conduct The Rise of Skywalker. The next month, Williams announced that it would be the last Star Wars film for which he would compose the score. In August 2019, at Tanglewood's Film Night, Williams revealed that scoring sessions were underway and that 80% of the music for Episode IX had been recorded and that an additional 40 minutes would be recorded at the request of director J. J. Abrams.

Recording of the score had begun in mid-July at Sony Pictures Studios' Barbra Streisand Scoring Stage in Culver City, but ended up requiring as many as 11 sessions scattered over a five-month period. Williams conducted the sessions himself, recording over three hours of music which consisted of new material and revisions of previous themes. Speaking about the recording process, he said that "It was a wonderful way to spend six or eight months...and for being grateful for having the energy and interest to work with the orchestra, which was very lovely." William Ross assisted with orchestrations, while mixing was handled by sound engineer Shawn Murphy. Like the previous sequel trilogy films, it was recorded with a 102-piece freelance orchestra together with a 100-voice Los Angeles Master Chorale. The final day of recording occurred on November 18, 2019, with many of the cast and executives present, such as Star Wars actors Mark Hamill, Daisy Ridley, Kelly Marie Tran and frequent collaborator Steven Spielberg.

In a lead up to the release of the soundtrack, a For Your Consideration soundtrack album was released on the Disney awards website on December 10, 2019, which consisted of 50 minutes of the music for the film. However, due to reasons unknown, it was taken down shortly after.

Track listing

Additional music

Charts

Awards

On February 20, 2020, John Williams won 3 IFMCA Awards for the score, including Score of the Year, Best Original Score for a Fantasy/Sci-Fi/Fantasy Film, and Film Score Composition of the Year for the film's main theme, The Rise of Skywalker. Williams was also nominated for the Academy Award for Best Original Score. Williams  also won the Saturn Award for Best Music for his work on the film at the 46th Saturn Awards.

References

2019 soundtrack albums
2010s film soundtrack albums
John Williams soundtracks
Star Wars film soundtracks
Walt Disney Records soundtracks